2-Me-DET, or 2-methyl-diethyltryptamine, is a lesser-known psychedelic drug.  It is the 2-methyl analog of DET. 2-Me-DET was first synthesized by Alexander Shulgin. In his book TiHKAL (Tryptamines I Have Known and Loved), the minimum dosage is listed as 80-120 mg, and the duration listed as 6–8 hours. 2-Me-DET produces pitch distortion, like that of DiPT. Very little data exists about the pharmacological properties, metabolism, and toxicity of 2-Me-DET.

See also 

 Tryptamine
 Psychedelics, dissociatives and deliriants

External links 
 2-Me-DET Entry in TIHKAL
 2-Me-DET Entry in TiHKAL • info

Psychedelic tryptamines
Diethylamino compounds